"Tighter, Tighter" is a song written by Bob King and Tommy James. Alive N Kickin' recorded it for their 1970 album, Alive N Kickin. The tune was also produced by King and James. It reached #7 on the Billboard Hot 100 in August 1970.  In Canada, the song peaked at #5.

Other versions
James released a version of the song in 1976 as a single, but it did not chart.

Chart performance

Weekly charts

Year-end charts

See also
 List of 1970s one-hit wonders in the United States

References

External links
 Lyrics of this song
 

1970 songs
1970 debut singles
1976 singles
Songs written by Tommy James
Tommy James songs
Roulette Records singles
Fantasy Records singles